General FitzRoy may refer to:

Charles FitzRoy (British Army officer) (1762–1831), British Army general
Lord Charles FitzRoy (British Army officer) (1764–1829), British Army general
William FitzRoy (British Army Officer) (1830–1902), British Army major general
George FitzRoy, 1st Duke of Northumberland (1665–1716), British Army lieutenant general